"End Credits" is the first single to be taken from drum and bass duo Chase & Status' second studio album, No More Idols. The single was co-written, co-produced and features vocals from Plan B, and was released on 29 October 2009, peaking at number nine on the UK Singles Chart.

Background
The song was used in a trailer for the video game F1 2010, and featured also in-game, as well as serving as the official theme from the Michael Caine film Harry Brown, in which Drew co-starred. The track has been covered by Jess Mills as a B-side for her 2011 single, "Live For What I'd Die For". The track also appeared in series 8, episode 2 of British comedy-drama Shameless in 2011. The main chord sequence of the song has been noted for its similarity to Radiohead's track, "Reckoner". The music video for "End Credits" was directed by Kim Gehrig, and features footage from Harry Brown. The promotional CD single features alternate artwork to the official release, and instead portrays Michael Caine pointing a gun (likely at Plan B). The VIP version of the track was released through RAM Records in the UK as a double AA-side of the VIP mix of "Is It Worth It", a track from the duo's debut album More Than Alot with vocals from Takura Tendayi.

Critical reception
Fraser McAlpine of BBC Chart Blog gave the song a positive review stating: "Perhaps buoyed by the success of Pendulum's radio-friendly take on drum'n'bass, London duo Chase & Status experimented with elements of hip-hop, indie and even Bollywood on last year's debut album More Than Alot. So well-regarded were the results that they landed the pair – Saul Milton and Will Kennard – a production gig on the new Rihanna album. Now, making the most of the buzz, they're back with new single 'End Credits'. Kicking off with a simple guitar riff that could almost pass for The Feeling, it's only when the beats drop around the minute mark that this becomes an identifiably Chase & Status affair. Combining their thumpingly effective d&b beats with strings, more guitars and Plan B's tender vocals, 'End Credits' has a soaring, cinematic feel while remaining perky enough to pack out the dancefloor. Proof positive, then, why Chase & Status are now being sought out by pop A-listers"..

Track listing

Personnel
 Saul Milton – producer, mixing
 Will Kennard – producer, mixing
 Mark Kennedy – engineer
 Rob Swire – mixing
 Stuart Hawked – mastering
 Plan B – vocals, producer
 Kim Gehrig – video director
 Juliette Larthe – video producer

Charts

Weekly charts

Year-end charts

Certifications

Release history

References

2009 singles
Chase & Status songs
Plan B (musician) songs
Songs about death
Song recordings produced by Chase & Status
Songs written by Plan B (musician)
Songs written by Saul Milton
Songs written by Will Kennard
Songs written for films
RAM Records singles
2009 songs